Kick at the Darkness is a tribute album to Canadian singer-songwriter Bruce Cockburn, released in 1991. The title comes from a line in the song "Lovers in a Dangerous Time": "gotta kick at the darkness 'til it bleeds daylight". The album was released on Intrepid Records.

The Barenaked Ladies' rendition of "Lovers in a Dangerous Time" was their first significant chart hit in Canada, reaching No. 16 the week of February 15, 1992.

Track listing
 "Lovers in a Dangerous Time" – Barenaked Ladies
 "A Long Time Love Song" – Martin Tielli and Jane Siberry
 "Lord of the Starfields" – Swing Gang
 "Feet Fall on the Road" – Five Guys Named Moe
 "Silver Wheels" – All Her Brothers are Drummers
 "All the Diamonds in the World" – Rebecca Jenkins
 "Wondering Where the Lions Are" – B-Funn
 "Stolen Land" – Chris Bottomley
 "Waiting for the Moon" – Fat Man Waving
 "If I Had a Rocket Launcher" – Cottage Industry
 "Call it Democracy" – Jellyfishbabies
 "One Day I Walk" – Skydiggers
 "Red Ships Take Off in the Distance" – Bob Wiseman

References 

Compilation albums by Canadian artists
Tribute albums
1991 compilation albums
Pop compilation albums
Rock compilation albums
Folk compilation albums